Kenneth Macdonald "Ken" Grant (September 1866 – 13 August 1922) was a telegraphist and member of the Queensland Legislative Assembly in Australia.

Biography
Grant was born in Geelong, Victoria, to parents William Grant and his wife Jessie (née McDonald) and attended Brisbane Normal School. He began his working life as a cadet in the Post and Telegraphs Department and became a telegraphist at the Rockhampton Post Office and Railway Traffic Office. Later on he was a director of the Blair Athol Land and Timber Co. and the principal of K.M. Grant and Co. Ltd.

In his younger days he was a keen sportsman and president of the Central Queensland Rugby League, and a patron of the Rockhampton Jockey Club and the Rockhampton Bowls Club.

Unmarried, he died from the complications of an attack of influenza in August 1922. His funeral proceeded from has Albion home to the Toowong Cemetery.

Political career
Grant represented the state seat of Rockhampton from 1902 until 1912. He then switched to the seat of Fitzroy in 1912 but was defeated by Harold Hartley in 1915. He started out representing the Labour Party but by the end of his political career he was a member of the Kidstonites.

He was the Chairman of Committees in 1910, Acting Secretary for Public Instruction in 1911-1912, and Home Secretary and Secretary for Mines in 1915.

References

Members of the Queensland Legislative Assembly
1866 births
1922 deaths
Australian Labor Party members of the Parliament of Queensland